Andrey Sidorov (born 25 June 1995) is an Uzbekistani footballer who plays as a midfielder who plays for Uzbekistan Super League team FK Kokand 1912.

Career

Club
On 1 August 2020, FK Khujand announced the departure of Sidorov.

International
Sidorov made his debut for the Uzbekistan national football team in May 2018, against Iran in a friendly. He also have played for the Uzbekistan national youth teams in international tournaments such as 2018 AFC U-23 Championship, in which he would win the tournament with Uzbekistan national under-23 football team, with him scoring the extra-time winner in the final after coming on as a substitute.

Honours

International
 AFC U-23 Championship: 2018

References

External links 
 
 
 

Living people
1995 births
Sportspeople from Tashkent
Uzbekistani footballers
Uzbekistan international footballers
Uzbekistan youth international footballers
Pakhtakor Tashkent FK players
FC Qizilqum Zarafshon players
PFK Nurafshon players
FK Khujand players
Uzbekistan Super League players
Footballers at the 2018 Asian Games
Association football midfielders
Asian Games competitors for Uzbekistan
Uzbekistani people of Russian descent